The Israel national football team has represented Israel in international association football since 1934, when it played its first official game (as Mandatory Palestine or Eretz Israel—"Land of Israel") against Egypt. It is fielded by the Israel Football Association (IFA), which has governed football in the country since 1928, and has borne its present name since the foundation of the State of Israel in 1948. Israel competed as a member of the Asian Football Confederation from 1956 until 1974, when it was expelled for political reasons; it then played without formal affiliation to any regional bloc for two decades. In 1994 the IFA was made a full member of the Union of European Football Associations (UEFA), enabling the inclusion of Israeli teams in UEFA competitions.

Since 1934, more than 491 players have appeared for the Israel national team; those 111 with 20 or more caps are listed here. The Israel national team's only major honour is the AFC Asian Cup, which it hosted and won in 1964. It has qualified for the FIFA World Cup final tournament once, in 1970, and for the Summer Olympic Games twice, in 1968 and in 1976.

Israel's all-time top goalscorer is Mordechai Spiegler, who scored 33 international goals in 83 matches between 1963 and 1977. Yossi Benayoun, a midfielder, holds the record for the most national team appearances, having played for Israel 99 times between 1998 and 2017. The team's highest-capped goalkeeper, Dudu Aouate, represented Israel 78 times between 1999 and 2013. The most-capped player of Arab-Israeli background is Walid Badir, who appeared for the national side 74 times between 1997 and 2007, scoring 12 goals.

Players 

Appearances and goals are composed of FIFA World Cup, Summer Olympic Games, AFC Asian Cup, and UEFA European Championship matches and each competition's required qualification matches, as well as numerous international friendly tournaments and matches. The statistics given here include some matches recognised as official by the Israel Football Association (IFA), but not by FIFA; the tallies maintained by FIFA for a given player may be slightly lower than the IFA's. The years given in the column marked "national team career" are those of each player's first and last international cap. Players are initially listed by number of caps, then number of goals scored. Where two or more players have the same number of caps and goals scored, they are initially listed alphabetically. Statistics are correct as of the match played on 9 September 2021.''

Notes and references 
Notes

References

External links 
 National Team at the Israel Football Association website

 
Association football player non-biographical articles